Izvoru Rău River may refer to:

 Izvoru Rău River (Bistrița)
 Izvoru Rău, a tributary of the Bârzava in Caraș-Severin County

See also 
 Izvoru Mare River (disambiguation)